The Ali Murad Mound is an archaeological site situated at Tehseel Johi, Dadu District, Sindh, Pakistan. The site was explored together with named by renowned archaeologist N. G. Majumdar. It is located at distance of 20 miles from Dadu towards south-west. The eight miles from Ghazi Shah Mound and 14 miles to the south of Johi town. At top of mound, an ancient hamlet was discovered surrounded by defensive walls built with stone blocks. According to Mortimer Wheeler, the Pottery of Harappan culture, terracotta figurines of bull and pig, chert flakes, a small bronze axe, beads of steatite, agate and carnelian and several terracotta of imitation cakes were found here. The fortified antique village or palace was recorded on this high mound.

References

Archaeological sites in Sindh
Dadu District